Nucleolysin TIAR is a protein that in humans is encoded by the TIAL1 gene.

The protein encoded by this gene is a member of a family of RNA-binding proteins, has three RNA recognition motifs (RRMs), and binds adenine and uridine-rich elements in mRNA and pre-mRNAs of a wide range of genes. It regulates various activities including translational control, splicing and apoptosis. Alternate transcriptional splice variants, encoding different isoforms, have been characterized. The different isoforms have been show to function differently with respect to post-transcriptional silencing.

References

Further reading

External links